Leticia Dolera (born 23 October 1981) is a Spanish actress. She was born in Barcelona, Catalonia, Spain. She is best known for her roles as Clara in the Spanish horror film REC 3: Genesis, Teresa in the 2003 film Imagining Argentina, and as Carmen in the UK television series Mad Dogs.

Career
Her career began with the series Al salir de clase (When Class Is Over), in which she played the role of Angela between 2000 and 2002.

From there, she began a successful film career with titles such as El otro lado de la cama (The other side of the bed), Imagining Argentina, Semen, una historia de amor (Semen, A History of Love) and Un café en cualquier esquina (Man Push Cart), a film which received three nominations at the Independent Spirit Awards.

In 2012, she starred in the third instalment of the REC series, receiving critical praise for her performance.

In the UK, she is best known for playing the character of Carmen in the Sky TV series, Mad Dogs (2012 to 2014).

In 2015 she wrote and directed the film Requirements To Be A Normal Person.

In February 2018 she published the book about feminism Morder la manzana. La revolución será feminista o no será.

In October 2019 premiered in Movistar+ the television series Vida perfecta, directed by and starring her, with good acceptance by critics. Public scrutiny and controversy around the production of the series (then tentatively titled Déjate llevar) began in 2018, when actress Aina Clotet denounced on Twitter that Dolera had decided not to hire her for the series because Clotet was pregnant.

Personal life
She is married to Spanish director Paco Plaza.

Filmography

Films
 Bellas durmientes (2001)
 The Other Side of the Bed (2002)
 Besos de gato (2003)
 The Emperor's Wife (2003)
 Imagining Argentina (2003)
 Semen, una historia de amor (2005)
 Man Push Cart (2005)
 Presumptes implicats (2007)
 Imago Mortis (2008)
 Prime Time (2008)
 De tu ventana a la mía (2011)
 REC 3: Genesis (2012)
 Los últimos días (2013)
 Requirements To Be A Normal Person (2015)
 The Bride (2015)
 Veronica (2017)
 ¿Qué te juegas? (2019)

Television
 Xat.Tv
 Al salir de clase (2001–2002)
 Hospital Central (2004)
 Los Serrano (2005)
 Pressumptes implicats (2006)
 Petits meurtres en famille (2006)
 El espejo (2007)
 Mà morta truca a la porta (2007)
 Guante blanco (2008)
 Mad Dogs (2012)
 El Barco (2013)
 Cero en Historia (2018)
 Vida perfecta (2019)

Theatre
 Las alegres comadres de Windsor

Short films
 La amenaza del fantasma
 Pum Pum, ¿Quién es?
 Habitaciones separadas
 La bufanda verde
 Cuál es la fecha de tu cumpleaños

Music videos
 Keane - "Disconnected"

References

External links

 
 
 
 Digital interview - July 2007 
 Blog on Leticia Dolera's 

1981 births
Living people
Actresses from Barcelona
Spanish feminists
Spanish film actresses
Spanish stage actresses
Spanish television actresses
21st-century Spanish actresses